M. A. Aleem (M. Abdul Aleem) is an Indian neurologist who is heading K.A.P. Viswanatham Government Medical College, also a former vice-principal of the government medical college Tiruchirappalli(Trichy). Aleem has served more than 28 years in the field of neurology. He was a president of Tiruchi Neuro Association.

Aleem served as executive committee member of  Indian Academy of neurology and Neurological Society of India. Dr.MA.Aleem was the vice-principal of K.A.P. Viswanatham Government Medical College. He is also a Consultant Neurologist and Epileptologist ABC Hospital, Trichy

Early life 
Aleem was born in Thuvarankurichi did his M.B.B.S. with CRRI from in at Thanjavur Medical College, India. He did his M.D. (Gen. Med.) in 1986 at Thanjavur Medical College. Later, he did his D.M. Neurology at Madurai Madurai Medical College.

Current Positions 
Aleem is the Vice Principal, HOD & Professor of Neurology Dept. of Neurology K.A.P. Viswanatham Government Medical College & MGM Govt. Hospital, Tiruchirappalli. He is also a visiting consultant Neurologist & Epileptologist at ABC Hospital Tiruchirappalli.

Aleem was Nominated as Brand Ambassador for Swachh Bharat Mission by The Tiruchirappalli City Corporation on 26 January 2019

Experience 
Aleem has a vast experience in the department of Neurology. Started his career as Assistant surgeon in Government of Tamil Nadu Medical services. He worked as a Senior Civil Asst. Surgeon at Thuvarankurichi, Tamil Nadu Medical services. And as a Visiting consultant physician at K.M. Crescent Hospital for more than 11 years. He working as a visiting consultant neurologist & epileptologist at ABC Hospital Trichy. As president of the Tiruchi Neuro Association, he has served as executive committee member in the Indian Academy of neurology and Neurological Society of India.

Family 

Aleem's father Mohamed Ibrahim is a business man from Singapore. Aleem's wife Fathima Aleem who is an ex-Chairman of ponnampatti panchayat - thuvarankurichi. They have 2 daughters Jasmine and Salma who have completed their engineering and one Son A.Mohamed Hakkim who is also a doctor by profession.

Awards 
 Lifetime Achievement Award’ by Tamil Nadu Dr. M.G.R. Medical University.
 Commendation Certificate from district Collector 1989.
 Junior traveling fellowship award by WFN 2001.
 Congress attendance award by ILEA Dublin Ireland 2003 to Attend 25th IEA, Lisbon.
 Travelling Bursary Award ILEA to attend 6th AOCA,  Kolalambur - 16.11.2006.
 Commendation Certificate from district collector 2005.
 Certificate of Appreciated from district collector 2006.
 Dr. Banumathy murugananthan award for excellence in medical  Publication in Tamil Nadu  state IMA Award 2008.
 Distinguished Alumni Award, Jamal Mohammed College, 2008
 Republic day award by Tiruchirappalli District Collector - 26.01.2010.
 Humanitarian Doctor Award by TNMB - 21.01.2010.
 Dr.Meena Life Time Achievement award by the Global Human Rights Organization 19.02.2011.
 Lifetime Achievement award by TiruchirappalliDistrict Minority forum   07.01.2012
 Certificate of appreciation by Tiruchirappalli Collector – 05.06.2012
 The man of the year 2012 Award by sanjeevi nagar welfare association Tiruchirappallion 15.01.2013

References 

Medical doctors from Tamil Nadu
21st-century Indian Muslims
People from Tiruchirappalli district
Living people
1957 births
Indian epileptologists